Abdali is an area in the Greater Amman Municipality, it is named relative to King Abdullah I who founded it during the 1940s. Large parts of the district are residential, but due its geographical location in the center of the city, it contains several important governmental buildings and businesses. The area is known for containing several bus stations serving routes to many cities in Jordan.

Neighborhoods
The district consists of 4 neighborhoods Jabal Al-Hussein, Jabal Al-Lweibdeh, Shmeisani, and Al-Madineh Al-Riyadiyah.
Jabal Al-Hussein and Jabal Al-Lweibdeh are among the oldest neighborhoods in the city, they have been marked by the Greater Amman Municipality as of great historical significance. They are preferred by several western expatriates who work or study in Amman, as their accommodate. 

A part of the Shmeisani neighborhood is residential, however, the other part contains several companies, banks, hospitals, schools and governmental buildings. Most notably; Al-Iskan Bank Building, Jordan Hospital, King Abdullah I Mosque, Parliament of Jordan building, Palace of Justice, Royal Cultural Center, Princess Haya Cultural Center, National Orthodox School, Rosary College for girls and numerous embassies. The Al-Madineh Al-Riyadiyah neighborhood contains Al Hussein Sports City while the rest of it is mostly residential.

The Central Business District of Amman

It is an Urban redevelopment in Al-Abdali that strives to make Amman a business, commercial and residential hub in the Middle East. The Shmeisani intersection is a multi level intersection that allows easy access to the Project through several tunnels and bridges.

Gallery

References

Districts of Amman
Populated places in Amman Governorate